Leon Anthony Drysdale (born 3 February 1991 in Walsall, England), is a footballer who played as a defender for Shrewsbury Town in The Football League.

He made his debut for the Shrews on 20 April 1999 in the Third Division clash with Rotherham United that ended in a 2–3 defeat at Gay Meadow.

He left the Shropshire side after their delegation, spells at AFC Telford United and Nuneaton Borough (loan) followed. He has since retired and works as a fireman in the West Midlands.

References

External links

1981 births
Living people
Sportspeople from Walsall
English footballers
Association football defenders
Shrewsbury Town F.C. players
Nuneaton Borough F.C. players
AFC Telford United players
Hednesford Town F.C. players
English Football League players
Cambridge United F.C. players